Bajani (also Romanized as Bājānī) is a village in Rudkhaneh Rural District, Rudkhaneh District, Rudan County, Hormozgan Province, Iran. As of the 2006 census, the village's population is 100. The village contains 22 families.

References 

Populated places in Rudan County